Zubayd  or Zubaid Zabid is an Arab tribe from the Yemeni Madhhij Qahtanite confederation, that is one of the largest Arab tribes in the Arab world. 

It participated in the Islamic conquests in the early days of Islam. Among them were Abu Bakr al-Zubaydi, the great companion Al-Harith bin Omair Al-Zubaidi and Amr bin Ma’di al-Zubaydi, a famous arabic warrior who joined Islam and one of the leader of the Battle of Al-Qadisiyah. 

The tribe  migrated to Iraq, Syria and Ahwaz from Yemen before and after the Islamic conquest. 

Many other tribes trace their lineage to Zubayd. ., Zubaid is mainly Muslims.

Other tribes that trace their lineage to Zubaid have their own separate Shaikhs, or tribal leaders, including Dulaim, Jubur, Al-Laheeb, Azzah, Obaid, Al Uqaydat, Al Bu Sultan, Al Bu Mohammed Shuwailat and Al Suwaed (Al-Saedi), and Al Bu Shabaan.

References

Bedouin groups
Tribes of Arabia
Tribes of Iraq
Shia communities